Chase Lake Wetland Management District is located in the U.S. state of North Dakota. The district is located in what is known as the prairie–potholes region of lakes and ponds, which were left behind by the retreat of glaciers at the end of the last ice age. Hundreds of waterfowl production areas, Wildlife Development Areas, wetland easements (private land managed by the government), grassland easements and the easement refuge known as Halfway Lake National Wildlife Refuge, are managed by the district. The district is a part of the Arrowwood National Wildlife Refuge Complex.

In the district, hundreds of thousands of birds either migrate through the region or stay and nest every year. Important waterfowl include the American white pelican whose numbers in the district are higher than in any other protected region in North America. Tundra swans, canada geese, bitterns, wood ducks, black-crowned night herons, pintails, Franklin's gull and the great blue heron are but a sampling of the 250 species of birds that have been identified on the refuge. White-tailed deer, muskrat, beaver, raccoon and skunk are but a few of the 40 mammal species that have been documented.

The district permits hunting and fishing within regulations, and proceeds from Duck Stamps sold to duck hunters are used to manage existing protected areas, as well as purchase additional lands from willing private landowners.

References

External links
 
 
 

National Wildlife Refuges in North Dakota
Protected areas of Stutsman County, North Dakota
Protected areas of Wells County, North Dakota